Subrace may refer to:

 Subrace, a taxonomic division below race (biology)
 Subrace or sub-race, a particular variety ("Grey Elf", "Cave Troll", etc.) of a fictional "race" in fantasy fiction and gaming